The IBM 1750, 2750 and 3750 Switching Systems were telephone exchange systems produced by IBM from the 1960s to the 1990s.

IBM engineers in the IBM La Gaude Research Laboratory, north-west of Nice in France, developed an electronic Private Automatic Branch Exchange: the first stored-program-controlled PABX to be marketed and installed in the world. The product family handled up to 2516 extensions and 356 trunk lines. They were among those very few IBM products to be still in use in five European countries for some 40 years following the 1969 market introduction of the IBM 2750 Switching System.
 
Before 1969 only electromechanical Strowger and Crossbar PABXs were available.

The family of IBM 1750, 2750 and 3750 Switching Systems was developed from the IBM 1800. Each system included twin stored-program controllers (each with 32K or 64K main storage}; some 600,000 lines of code; emergency and every-night automatic switchover; twin disks (none for the 2750); and solid-state switching. Extension, trunk and tie lines were connected by discrete transistors on plug-in panels. All systems were assembled in IBM's French Montpellier factory for France, Germany, Italy, and the UK.

Early development

The French engineers in IBM La Gaude in the late 1960s developed a prototype system based on the IBM 1130 to handle 500 telephone extensions and some 20 trunk lines to the local telephone exchange. 

They then developed the marketable IBM 2750 Switching System, code named Carnation, with IBM 1800 computers – two 1800s for fail-safe redundancy –  each with 32K or later 64K of magnetic-core memory, and IBM Solid Logic Technology (SLT), but no disks (disk storage was new and very expensive then). Maximising reliability, each central processing unit had its own transistorised switching network with crosspoint switching.

The 2750 was greatly influenced by the European national telephone authorities (PTTs) who insisted on isolating-line transformers to protect their engineers. The 2750 had large 40cm-by-30cm plug-in extension packs each handling only four telephone extensions with standard PTT 50-volt telephones. The Assembler-language program was loaded using punched paper tape, needing some 90 minutes for each of the two CPUs. Smaller maintenance programs could be loaded into unprotected storage. Fault finding was limited to 4K programs and needed an oscilloscope — but the 2750 was reliable enough to run 24/7. 

An attached IBM Selectric typewriter let customers change system facilities such as the extension numbers of telephones of repositioned staff. The 2750 was very quiet as it was transistorised with no moving parts other than the cooling fans in the cabinets, compared with the noisy, electro-mechanical Strowger PABX systems then everywhere across Europe.

Countries, costs, installations, 1968 to 2010

The 1968-available 2750 was sold in France, Germany, Italy, and Belgium; 3750s (from 1970) and 1750s (from 1979) were sold in these four countries and the United Kingdom. In the UK a 2750 was installed in the IBM Wigmore Street, London office; another was in IBM's plant in Havant, Hampshire: this was used for demonstrations and by the employees at the plant.  The Netherlands installed some in IBM sites. Costs ranged from $150,000 to $600,000, plus up to $60,000 for the 3750's large room, air conditioning, and false flooring because of the extensive cabling between the three 3750 cabinets. By the time the 1750 was withdrawn from sales in 1988, there were some 300 systems installed in Europe. 1750s and 3750s were still in use in the year 2010 -- some of the longest-life IBM products.

Functions new to markets

Long-distance and particularly international telephone calls were still very expensive in the 1970s. Although the 3750 when first marketed in 1970 cost almost double the equivalent-sized non-stored-program machines, the business case was compelling because the number of telephone operators could be halved, and for the first time organisations could determine what calls were made, where they were made to, and who made them. Suddenly the phone bill, instead of being a single item, could be allocated to departments and individuals, with details of called numbers and duration. However, systems were mostly ordered because of the first-time use of touch-tone telephones, call re-routing, short-code dialling etc (see below) — all functions taken for granted today.

UK sales

In the UK, the first 3750 customer was British Caledonian Airways, quickly followed by Bland Payne Insurance Brokers, Derbyshire County Council and Geest Bananas. Later many household names installed 3750, such as Great Universal Stores, Grosvenor House Hotel, Rowntree Mackintosh, Selfridges, Kwik Save, American Express, Mobil (a network including 1750s on North Sea oil and gas platforms), Unigate (dairies), Royal Bank of Scotland, Reckitt & Colman, Tesco, CWS (Co-operative Wholesale Society), and Greater Manchester Police (GMP) — GMP installed a 3750 at their headquarters Chester House, and later a network of 1750s around the Greater Manchester area.

Systems

The systems all had both voice and data functions.  Early-1970s computers had hardly any typewriter-like terminals and certainly no screens – the IBM Switching Systems introduced the novelty of simple digital-data capture from every touch-tone telephone extension. But customers largely bought the systems for their then-new voice and management facilities.

The systems needed secure electricity night and day (2 to 15 kilowatts).

Extension facilities
Facilities for the extensions were revolutionary at the time and particularly valued by organisations in financial and other industries with relatively highly-paid office-based employees:
 Touch-tone telephones (then practically new to Europe) for both voice and data entry
 Call rerouting from multiple extensions to answer points
 Camp on to a busy extension or external circuit with automatic call back
 Short-code dialling to national and international numbers
 Temporary call barring 
 Distinctive ring cadences (different cadences for internal and incoming external calls)
 Dialled paging 
 Group answering
 Authorised user intrusion
 Add-on third party
 Call pick-up
 Non-dialled connection (an off-hook extension automatically dials an extension).

Management facilities

  
Most management facilities were new to the PABX market:
 IBM 3755 Operator Desk: optionally with braille-coded keys and audible alarms
 Extension number and facility changes made from a central keyboard
 Call cost recording
 Classes of service for extensions
 Traffic analysis
 Night service: pre-night, standard, special-type-1, and special-type-2 night services.

Data facilities
The then-novel data facilities included:
 Data collection available from every touch-tone extension to the switching system or through it to an IBM computer 
 IBM 3221 Numeric Multi-function Device: an extension-connected desktop terminal with a numeric keyboard and badge/card reader
 IBM 3223 Entry/Exit Reporter: an extension-connected wall-mounted magnetic-card-reader terminal for attendance recording and controlled access to secure areas
 Contact monitoring and operation.
IBM’s customers for instance used the data functions for staff to report chargeable activity from their telephones.

Later additional facilities
Over time IBM introduced further functions:
 Satellite operation (remote operator call handling)
 The IBM Audio Distribution System (IBM 7770, based on an IBM Series/1 computer) – then-novel centralised voice-message recording for up to three thousand 1750, 3750 and worldwide users; 100 hours of recorded messages; and optional connection to an IBM computer for notification on recipients' screens 
 Hotel functions such as automatic wake-up calls 
 Partitioning: multiple organisations using one system.

Networking
Widespread networks of systems became an important market for IBM. These multiple interconnected systems had central operating and control functions, tie-line busy back-up or rerouting via the public network, traffic saturation control, tie-line access restriction, network numbering up to 7 digits, remote paging, camping-on a remote extension, and adding a third party remotely.

Follow-on products

By about 1984 IBM could see that there would be few sales by about 1986 of the dated-technology 1750 and 3750 and that IBM's French development centre in La Gaude was not successfully developing a replacement product. So in 1984, IBM bought the American company ROLM that had more than 20,000 PABXs installed in the USA. IBM planned the ROLM system to be marketed in Europe as the IBM 8750, to replace the 1750 and 3750: despite much IBM expenditure, this did not happen, largely because of the difficulty of modifying the ROLM product for European conditions. IBM then unsuccessfully negotiated to sell Siemens PABXs, before stopping marketing all PABXs. IBM continued to maintain 1750s and 3750s, before contracting others to maintain them into the 2000s — these were among those few IBM products to be still in use for nearly 40 years after their market introduction.

IBM 8750

IBM bought land in Wootton Bassett just west of Swindon in England to build a ROLM factory for Europe — the land was not used. In 1987 IBM started to market the ROLM-derived IBM 8750 Business Communications System in Austria, Belgium, France, Germany, Italy, Luxemburg, and the UK. Principally for homologation, a few had been installed in IBM locations, such as IBM Havant and IBM Portsmouth in England – however none were installed in customer locations.

The 8750 had from 91 to 3000 telephone extensions; up to 1000 simultaneous conversations; a computer based on a Motorola 68020; up to 16 IBM 8755 Operator Consoles; a 30MB fixed disk; main/satellite working with 3750s and 1750s; digital trunks in Belgium, Italy and the UK; and used ISDN and Systems Network Architecture (SNA) networks.

References

Telephone exchange equipment
1750, 2750 and 3750